Norrlandsflyg AB was a Swedish helicopter operator which provided search and rescue under contract with the Swedish Maritime Administration and air ambulance services for Västra Götaland County. The company had its headquarters and technical base at Göteborg City Airport (Säve) and helicopters stationed in Gällivare, Gothenburg, Ronneby, Sundsvall, Stockholm and Visby. Norrlandsflyg operated twelve Sikorsky S-76 helicopters.

According to the helicopter enthusiast website Nordic Rotors, the services were fully taken over in 2011 by the Swedish Maritime Administration.

References

External links 
 

Defunct airlines of Sweden
Air ambulance services in Sweden
Helicopter airlines